The 2018 United States House of Representatives elections in Washington were held on November 6, 2018, to elect the 10 U.S. representatives from the state of Washington, one from each of the state's 10 congressional districts. The elections coincided with other elections to the House of Representatives, elections to the United States Senate and various state and local elections. All nine incumbents seeking re-election were re-elected, however the Democratic Party won the open-seat in the 8th District previously held by a Republican, improving from a 6-4 margin to a 7-3 margin.

Overview
Results of the 2018 United States House of Representatives elections in Washington by district:

District 1

The 1st congressional district is located along the Puget Sound from the Canada–US border to King County.
The district has a PVI of D+6. The incumbent is Democrat Suzan DelBene, who has represented the district since 2012. She was re-elected with 55% of the vote in 2016.

Primary election

Results

General election

Results

District 2

The 2nd congressional district includes all of Island and San Juan counties and neighboring areas on the mainland from Bellingham in the north to Lynnwood in the south. The district has a PVI of D+10. The incumbent is Democrat Rick Larsen, who has represented the district since 2001. He was re-elected with 64% of the vote in 2016.

Primary election

Results

General election

District 3

The 3rd congressional district encompasses the southernmost portion of western and central Washington. It includes the counties of Lewis, Pacific, Wahkiakum, Cowlitz, Clark, Skamania, and Klickitat, and a small sliver of southern Thurston county. The district has a PVI of R+4. The incumbent is Republican Jaime Herrera Beutler, who has represented the district since 2011. She was re-elected with 62% of the vote in 2016.

Primary election

Results

General election

Polling

Results

District 4

The 4th congressional district is located in central Washington, covering the counties of, Douglas, Okanogan, Grant, Yakima, Franklin, Benton, and Adams. The district is dominated by the Yakima and Tri-Cities areas. The district has a PVI of R+13. The incumbent is Republican Dan Newhouse, who has represented the district since 2015. He was re-elected with 58% of the vote in 2016.

Primary election

Results

General election

Results

District 5

The 5th congressional district is located in Eastern Washington and includes the counties of Ferry, Stevens, Pend Oreille, Lincoln, Spokane, Whitman, Walla Walla, Columbia, Garfield, and Asotin.  It is centered on Spokane, the state's second largest city. The district has a PVI of R+8. The incumbent is Republican Cathy McMorris Rodgers, who has represented the district since 2005. She was re-elected with 60% of the vote in 2016.

Primary election

Results

General election

Debates
Complete video of debate, October 24, 2018

Endorsements

Polling

Results

District 6

The 6th congressional district includes the Olympic Peninsula, most of the Kitsap Peninsula, and most of the city of Tacoma. The district has a PVI of D+6. The incumbent is Democrat Derek Kilmer, who has represented the district since 2013. He was re-elected with 62% of the vote in 2016.

Primary election

Results

General election

Results

District 7

The 7th congressional district includes most of Seattle, all of Vashon Island, Edmonds, Shoreline, Kenmore, and parts of Burien and Normandy Park. The district has a PVI of D+33. The incumbent is Democrat Pramila Jayapal, who has represented the district since 2017. She was elected with 56% of the vote in 2016 to replace retiring Democratic Representative Jim McDermott.

Primary election

Results

General election

Results

District 8

The 8th congressional district includes the eastern portions of King and Pierce counties and crosses the Cascade mountains to include Chelan and Kittitas counties.  The population centers on the west side of the mountains include the exurban communities of Sammamish, Issaquah, and Auburn.  On the east side, the 8th's population centers are rural communities Wenatchee, Leavenworth, and Ellensburg. The district has a PVI of EVEN.

Dave Reichert's retirement made this the only open seat in Washington in 2018, as well as the only seat to change party hands.

Primary election

Results

General election

Endorsements

Debates
Complete video of debate, October 17, 2018

Polling

Dino Rossi vs. generic Democrat

Dino Rossi vs. Jason Rittereiser

Dino Rossi vs. Shannon Hader

Results

District 9

The 9th congressional district encompasses a long, somewhat narrow area in western Washington through the densely populated central Puget Sound region, from Tacoma in the south to Bellevue in the north. The district has a PVI of D+21. The incumbent is Democrat Adam Smith, who has represented the district since 1997. He was re-elected with 73% of the vote in 2016. The 9th was the only district in Washington to have Democrats win both spots in the blanket primary, with 48% of the vote going to the Adam Smith, the incumbent, 27% going to Sarah Smith, a progressive challenger, and 25% going to Doug Blaser, the sole Republican candidate. Incumbent Adam Smith won the general election soundly, receiving 68% of the vote.

Primary election

Results

General election

Results

District 10

The 10th congressional district encompasses the state capital of Olympia and surrounding areas. The district has a PVI of D+5. The incumbent is Democrat Denny Heck, who has represented the district since 2013. He was re-elected with 59% of the vote in 2016.

Primary election

Results

General election

Results

References

External links
Candidates at Vote Smart
Candidates at Ballotpedia
Campaign finance at FEC
Campaign finance at OpenSecrets

Official campaign websites of first district candidates
Jeffrey Beeler (R) for Congress
Suzan DelBene (D) for Congress

Official campaign websites of second district candidates
Rick Larsen (D) for Congress
Brian Luke (L) for Congress

Official campaign websites of third district candidates
Jaime Herrera Beutler (R) for Congress
Carolyn Long (D) for Congress

Official campaign websites of fourth district candidates
Christine Brown (D) for Congress
Dan Newhouse (R) for Congress

Official campaign websites of fifth district candidates
Lisa Brown (D) for Congress
Cathy McMorris Rodgers (R) for Congress

Official campaign websites of sixth district candidates
Douglas Dightman (R) for Congress
Derek Kilmer (D) for Congress

Official campaign websites of seventh district candidates
Pramila Jayapal (D) for Congress
Craig Keller (R) for Congress

Official campaign websites of eighth district candidates
Dino Rossi (R) for Congress
Kim Schrier (D) for Congress

Official campaign websites of ninth district candidates
Adam Smith (D) for Congress
Sarah Smith (D) for Congress

Official campaign websites of tenth district candidates
Joseph Brumbles (R) for Congress
Dennis Heck (D) for Congress

2018
Washington
United States House of Representatives